The 2020–21 East Carolina Pirates men's basketball team represents East Carolina University during the 2020–21 NCAA Division I men's basketball season. The Pirates are led by third year head coach, Joe Dooley, who previously coached the Pirates from 1995 to 1999, and play their home games at Williams Arena at Minges Coliseum as seventh-year members of the American Athletic Conference. They finished the season 8-11, 2-10 in AAC Play to finish in last place. They lost in the first round of the AAC tournament to UCF.

Previous season
The Pirates finished the 2019–20  season 11–20, 5–13 in AAC play to finish in 11th place. They entered as the No. 11 seed in the AAC tournament, which was ultimately cancelled due to the coronavirus pandemic.

Offseason

Departures

Recruiting class of 2020

2021 recruiting class

Preseason

AAC preseason media poll

On October 28, The American released the preseason Poll and other preseason awards

Preseason Awards
 All-AAC First Team - Jayden Gardner (*unanimous selection)

Roster

Schedule and results

COVID-19 impact

Due to the ongoing COVID-19 pandemic, the Pirates' schedule is subject to change, including the cancellation or postponement of individual games, the cancellation of the entire season, or games played either with minimal fans or without fans in attendance and just essential personnel.

ECU opted out of the Gulf Coast Showcase due to COVID-19 concerns. 
The game vs. Belmont Abbey due to positive COVID-19 cases in the Belmont Abbey program. 
The games vs. Temple rescheduled for February 11th was moved to Philadelphia.
The game vs. Wichita State scheduled for February 21st was moved to Wichita.

Schedule

|-
!colspan=12 style=| Regular season
|-

|-
!colspan=12 style=| AAC tournament
|-

Awards and honors

American Athletic Conference honors

All-AAC First Team
Jayden Gardner

Source

References

East Carolina Pirates men's basketball seasons
East Carolina
East Carolina Pirates men's basketball
East Carolina Pirates men's basketball